The 2001–02 Belgian Hockey League season was the 82nd season of the Belgian Hockey League, the top level of ice hockey in Belgium. Six teams participated in the league, and HYC Herentals won the championship.

Regular season

Playoffs

5th place 
 Chiefs Leuven - White Caps Turnhout 1:9/5:7

Semifinals 
 Griffoens Geel - Phantoms Deurne 2:7/4:10
 Olympia Heist op den Berg - HYC Herentals 2:2/3:4

3rd place 
 Olympia Heist op den Berg - Griffoens Geel 8:3

Final 
 Phantoms Deurne - HYC Herentals 5:1

References
Season on hockeyarchives.info

Belgian Hockey League
Belgian Hockey League seasons
Bel